Moscow City Duma District 3 is one of 45 constituencies in Moscow City Duma. The constituency has covered parts of North-Western Moscow since 2014. From 1993-2005 District 3 also was based in South-Eastern and Central Moscow; from 2005-2014 the constituency was based in Northern Moscow and Zelenograd (it actually overlapped the entirety of State Duma Sheremetyevo constituency in 2005-2009).

Members elected

Election results

2001

|-
! colspan=2 style="background-color:#E9E9E9;text-align:left;vertical-align:top;" |Candidate
! style="background-color:#E9E9E9;text-align:left;vertical-align:top;" |Party
! style="background-color:#E9E9E9;text-align:right;" |Votes
! style="background-color:#E9E9E9;text-align:right;" |%
|-
|style="background-color:"|
|align=left|Inna Svyatenko
|align=left|Independent
|
|30.13%
|-
|style="background-color:"|
|align=left|Aleksandr Shabalov
|align=left|Independent
|
|24.77%
|-
|style="background-color:"|
|align=left|Igor Shapovalov
|align=left|Independent
|
|11.89%
|-
|style="background-color:"|
|align=left|Vladimir Rodionov
|align=left|Independent
|
|8.62%
|-
|style="background-color:black|
|align=left|Maksim Tretyukhin
|align=left|Anarchists
|
|3.11%
|-
|style="background-color:"|
|align=left|Oleg Chirkov
|align=left|Independent
|
|2.91%
|-
|style="background-color:#000000"|
|colspan=2 |against all
|
|14.41%
|-
| colspan="5" style="background-color:#E9E9E9;"|
|- style="font-weight:bold"
| colspan="3" style="text-align:left;" | Total
| 
| 100%
|-
| colspan="5" style="background-color:#E9E9E9;"|
|- style="font-weight:bold"
| colspan="4" |Source:
|
|}

2005

|-
! colspan=2 style="background-color:#E9E9E9;text-align:left;vertical-align:top;" |Candidate
! style="background-color:#E9E9E9;text-align:left;vertical-align:top;" |Party
! style="background-color:#E9E9E9;text-align:right;" |Votes
! style="background-color:#E9E9E9;text-align:right;" |%
|-
|style="background-color:"|
|align=left|Viktor Ivanov (incumbent)
|align=left|United Russia
|
|37.50%
|-
|style="background-color:"|
|align=left|Pyotr Miloserdov
|align=left|Communist Party
|
|18.12%
|-
|style="background-color:"|
|align=left|Zhanna Nemtsova
|align=left|Independent
|
|9.19%
|-
|style="background-color:"|
|align=left|Lyudmila Lipina
|align=left|Liberal Democratic Party
|
|8.42%
|-
|style="background-color:"|
|align=left|Andrey Morozov
|align=left|Russian Party of Life
|
|8.39%
|-
|style="background-color:"|
|align=left|Boris Berdnik
|align=left|Agrarian Party
|
|7.99%
|-
|style="background-color:"|
|align=left|Vladimir Morozov
|align=left|Independent
|
|3.32%
|-
| colspan="5" style="background-color:#E9E9E9;"|
|- style="font-weight:bold"
| colspan="3" style="text-align:left;" | Total
| 
| 100%
|-
| colspan="5" style="background-color:#E9E9E9;"|
|- style="font-weight:bold"
| colspan="4" |Source:
|
|}

2009

|-
! colspan=2 style="background-color:#E9E9E9;text-align:left;vertical-align:top;" |Candidate
! style="background-color:#E9E9E9;text-align:left;vertical-align:top;" |Party
! style="background-color:#E9E9E9;text-align:right;" |Votes
! style="background-color:#E9E9E9;text-align:right;" |%
|-
|style="background-color:"|
|align=left|Viktor Ivanov (incumbent)
|align=left|United Russia
|
|54.18%
|-
|style="background-color:"|
|align=left|Sergey Nikitin
|align=left|Communist Party
|
|15.62%
|-
|style="background-color:"|
|align=left|Viktor Fedoruk
|align=left|A Just Russia
|
|10.01%
|-
|style="background-color:"|
|align=left|Andrey Vlasov
|align=left|Liberal Democratic Party
|
|8.81%
|-
|style="background-color:"|
|align=left|Vladimir Morozov
|align=left|Independent
|
|6.40%
|-
| colspan="5" style="background-color:#E9E9E9;"|
|- style="font-weight:bold"
| colspan="3" style="text-align:left;" | Total
| 
| 100%
|-
| colspan="5" style="background-color:#E9E9E9;"|
|- style="font-weight:bold"
| colspan="4" |Source:
|
|}

2014

|-
! colspan=2 style="background-color:#E9E9E9;text-align:left;vertical-align:top;" |Candidate
! style="background-color:#E9E9E9;text-align:left;vertical-align:top;" |Party
! style="background-color:#E9E9E9;text-align:right;" |Votes
! style="background-color:#E9E9E9;text-align:right;" |%
|-
|style="background-color:"|
|align=left|Valery Skobinov (incumbent)
|align=left|United Russia
|
|51.07%
|-
|style="background-color:"|
|align=left|Yury Anashkin
|align=left|Independent
|
|15.81%
|-
|style="background-color:"|
|align=left|Dmitry Sarayev
|align=left|Communist Party
|
|14.00%
|-
|style="background-color:"|
|align=left|Albert Arzumanyan
|align=left|Yabloko
|
|6.19%
|-
|style="background-color:"|
|align=left|Vladimir Demidko
|align=left|A Just Russia
|
|5.54%
|-
|style="background-color:"|
|align=left|Daniil Belov
|align=left|Liberal Democratic Party
|
|4.38%
|-
| colspan="5" style="background-color:#E9E9E9;"|
|- style="font-weight:bold"
| colspan="3" style="text-align:left;" | Total
| 
| 100%
|-
| colspan="5" style="background-color:#E9E9E9;"|
|- style="font-weight:bold"
| colspan="4" |Source:
|
|}

2019

|-
! colspan=2 style="background-color:#E9E9E9;text-align:left;vertical-align:top;" |Candidate
! style="background-color:#E9E9E9;text-align:left;vertical-align:top;" |Party
! style="background-color:#E9E9E9;text-align:right;" |Votes
! style="background-color:#E9E9E9;text-align:right;" |%
|-
|style="background-color:"|
|align=left|Aleksandr Solovyov
|align=left|A Just Russia
|
|34.95%
|-
|style="background-color:"|
|align=left|Sabina Tsvetkova
|align=left|Independent
|
|32.94%
|-
|style="background-color:"|
|align=left|Leonid Voskresensky
|align=left|Communists of Russia
|
|20.62%
|-
|style="background-color:"|
|align=left|Yury Shevchenko
|align=left|Liberal Democratic Party
|
|7.19%
|-
| colspan="5" style="background-color:#E9E9E9;"|
|- style="font-weight:bold"
| colspan="3" style="text-align:left;" | Total
| 
| 100%
|-
| colspan="5" style="background-color:#E9E9E9;"|
|- style="font-weight:bold"
| colspan="4" |Source:
|
|}

Notes

References

Moscow City Duma districts